Associated Training Services, commonly known as ATS is a heavy equipment training institution based in Sun Prairie, Wisconsin. It was founded in 1959 by Robert Klabacka as the National Institute of Concrete Construction. The institute offers training programs in heavy equipment, mobile cranes, construction-related trucks, rigging, signaling, and commercial motor vehicles. ATS is one of the oldest training institution in United States of America has been an accredited sponsor providing accredited crane operator certification through the National Center for Construction Education and Research (NCCER), in Alachua, Florida since 2003,  and the National Commission for the Certification of Crane Operators (NCCCO)

History
Klabacka started the Diesel Truck Driver Training School on eighty acres of land ten miles from Madison, Wisconsin in 1963, the organization still maintains its primary office and training facilities at the location. ATS was founded in 1996 as an affiliate of Diesel Truck Driver Training School. Since its formation, Associated Training Services has become a nationally recognized school has expanded its course offerings.

Training programs

Heavy Equipment Training
Associated Training Services provides training in following types of heavy equipment.
Backhoes, Excavators
Loaders, Bulldozer
Dump trucks, Class-A CDL
Wheel tractor-scraper, Grader
All-Terrain Forklifts, Compactors

Equipment Transportation
Site Layout and Grade Reading
Horizontal Directional Drilling (HDD)
Digger Derrick

Crane Operator Training
The school’s crane operator training teaches people how to operate a variety of mobile cranes along with subjects such as:
Crane set-up
Wire rope
Load dynamics
Lift Planning
Load Charts
Rigging
Signaling

NCCCO Certification
Small & Large Hydraulic cranes
Fixed cab mobile cranes
Swing cab mobile cranes
Lattice Boom Cranes
Written & Practical Pretesting
Rigger & Signal person Training

Rigger/Signalperson

The ATS rigger training programs will certify rigger/signalperson personnel to meet the new OSHA crane mandate. Training covers the following
Inspect rigging before use
Identify and attach rigging with knowledge of hitch configurations, capacities, and basic knots
Recognize associated hazards
Signal operations
Use of various types of rigging equipment and basic hitches and their applications
Estimate load weight and center of gravity
Identify lift points
Determine and select rigging based on loading
Perform pre-use inspection of rigging and lift points
Identify and attach rigging with knowledge of hitch configurations and load angle factors, rigging capacities, and load integrity
Understand load dynamics and associated hazards

Class-A CDL Training

ATS provides following CDL learners permit.

Class-A Commercial License
Behind-The-Wheel Training
Local & Long Haul Employment
Backing/Docking Practice
Written and Road Testing
Onsite Recruiting

Military Benefits Program
Associated Training Services (ATS) is also a veteran's approved training school.

References

External links
Official website

Dane County, Wisconsin
Training companies of the United States
Operator
Driver's education